In the Commonwealth Caribbean, a Legal Education Certificate is a professional certification awarded to a person who has completed a course of study and training at a law school established by the Council of Legal Education. It was created by Articles 4 and 5 of the 1970 Agreement Establishing the Council of Legal Education.

Awarding institutions
There are three law schools which are empowered to award LECs: the Norman Manley Law School in Jamaica, the Hugh Wooding Law School in Trinidad and Tobago, and the Eugene Dupuch Law School in The Bahamas. In general, LL.B. graduates of the University of the West Indies are entitled to automatic admission to the above law schools, whereas others must take an entrance examination. Another agreement allows University of Guyana graduates to bypass the entrance exam as well. This exemption only applies to Guyanese nationals. In 2010, Solicitor-General of Belize Oscar Ramjeet lobbied for the exemption to be extended to Belizeans.

An LEC allows its holder to be admitted to practise law in any country or territory which is a signature to the agreement. In general, no person who does not hold an LEC may be so admitted. The original agreement exempted persons who were qualified to practise law on or before 1 October 1971, or who were undergoing a course of study leading to a qualification which would have enabled them to practise law before that date and who completed that course before 1 January 1980. A supplementary agreement in September 1984 extended the transitional period, and also provided for separate principals for each of the law schools empowered to award LECs.

Signatory countries, territories, and organisations

Belize did not join the 1984 supplement initially, but eventually signed it later. It was a signatory to the 1970 agreement as "British Honduras".

References

1970 introductions
Educational qualifications in the Caribbean
Professional certification in law